Magnolia figo (also called banana shrub, port wine magnolia, Michelia figo) is an evergreen tree in the magnolia genus. It is native to China.

Initially described as by Portuguese missionary and naturalist João de Loureiro as Liriodendron figo, it was reclassified as Michelia figo by German botanist Curt Polycarp Joachim Sprengel. In 2006, a cladistic analysis of the genus Michelia found them to lie within the genus Magnolia, with the name now being Magnolia figo.

It is cultivated as an ornamental plant in gardens for its fragrant flowers, which are cream-white and sometimes yellow, purple rounded, or light-purple, and strongly scented with isoamyl alcohol. It is also popular to keep M. figo as a houseplant. Flower buds, as well as new leaves, are covered with hairs, giving it a texture similar to that of velvet. The leaves are leathery, dark glossy-green, up to 10 cm long.
This plant is used in Shanghai, China, as a tall evergreen hedge.  It grows very slowly and matures into a large evergreen compact tree.  It grows in acid and alkaline soil very well, but is susceptible to black soot.

References

Further reading
 
 Kew Plant List for Magnolia figo
 IPNI Listing
 Fact Sheet FPS-404 , University of Florida

figo
Trees of China
Garden plants of Asia
Ornamental trees